Francisco Elías Rojas Mendoza (born January 13, 1991 in La Troncal) is an Ecuadorian footballer who plays as a midfielder for Manta. His older brother is Joao Rojas.

Honors
Independiente José Terán
Serie B: 2009

References

External links
FEF card 

1991 births
Living people
People from La Troncal
Ecuadorian footballers
C.S.D. Independiente del Valle footballers
S.D. Aucas footballers
Deportivo Azogues footballers
Manta F.C. footballers
L.D.U. Quito footballers
S.D. Quito footballers
Association football midfielders